Gadna Tel Aviv Yehuda Football Club, is a football club in Tel Aviv, Israel. The club is one of the most successful youth academies in the history of Israel, competing in youth competitions at all age levels.

History
Gadna Yehuda was created in 1947 as a feeder team in the hope of transferring young Israeli players to the top clubs in Israel.

In 2008, after more than 61 years as only working in the youth leagues, the club created a senior side. In the 2010–11 season the senior side of the club got promoted to Liga Bet after they won Liga Gimel Tel Aviv Division. In the 2012–13 season they finished 14th in Liga Bet South A Division, and got relegated after losing the relegation play-offs against Hapoel Kiryat Ono and Maccabi Bnei Jaljulia. the senior club did not enter Liga Gimel at the 2013–14 season.

Honours

Youth

Senior

League

Cups

Notes

External links
An article about the club's 60th Anniversary on Livegames.co.il

Football clubs in Israel
Football clubs in Tel Aviv
Association football clubs established in 1947
1947 establishments in Mandatory Palestine